Meditation music is music performed to aid in the practice of meditation. It can have a specific religious content, but also more recently has been associated with modern composers who use meditation techniques in their process of composition, or who compose such music with no particular religious group as a focus. The concept also includes music performed as an act of meditation.

History
Modern meditation music in the 20th century began when composers such as John Cage, Stuart Dempster, Pauline Oliveros, Terry Riley, La Monte Young and Lawrence Ball began to combine meditation techniques and concepts, and music. Specific works include Karlheinz Stockhausen's Inori (1974), Mantra (1970), Hymnen (1966–67), Stimmung (1968), and Aus den sieben Tagen (1968), and Ben Johnston, whose Visions and Spells (a realization of Vigil (1976)), requires a meditation period prior to performance. R. Murray Schafer's concepts of clairaudience (clean hearing) as well as the ones found in his The Tuning of the World (1977) are meditative.

Stockhausen describes Aus den sieben Tagen as "intuitive music" and in the piece "Es" from this cycle the performers are instructed to play only when not thinking or in a state of nonthinking (Von Gunden asserts that this is contradictory and should be "think about your playing"). John Cage was influenced by Zen and pieces such as Imaginary Landscape No. 4 for twelve radios are "meditations that measure the passing of time".

Relational effects 
Music can provide many psychological benefits including stress reduction, improved memory, and general improvement to cognitive performance. Research shows that the activity of listening to music can aid in detaching a person from their surroundings and help focus on their own thoughts and actions. When applied specifically to a meditative setting, music can aid in mindfulness, visualization, and contemplation. According to the NHS, these qualities can increase personal awareness and help identify signs of stress and anxiety. Practicing mindfulness can help a person be more observant of their present thoughts and actions. Research shows that meditation music can improve confidence during the practice of meditation.

In a July 2018 study, volunteers between ages 60–80 who were listening to healing music and meditating for 1–2 hours a day and eating a sugar-free healthy diet exhibited sharper memory and cognitive skills with happy and cheerful behavioral patterns compared to those who were not.

Meditation music can help improve focus while doing mechanical tasks. A June 2019 study that observed neurosurgeons performing microsurgical training bypasses with and without meditation music showed a slight improvement in the total time utilized by novice surgeons. While the total time utilized by experienced surgeons remained unchanged, the thread length used in the training bypasses was significantly different for both surgeons.

Meditation music can have positive effects on people recovering from drug addiction. In general, spiritual meditation may promote addiction recovery as well as improve the psychological and mental health outcomes of drug addiction; this includes reducing depression, anxiety and stress symptoms. In a January 2020 study, it was concluded that meditation music conducted by Young-Dong Kim can be useful therapy to prevent the reinstatement of methamphetamine addiction during abstinence in rats.

Christian meditation music
Some Christian faiths, particularly the Catholic Church, reject meditation practice from outside their traditions, particularly new-age music. However, the Olivier Messiaen piece referenced above is explicitly Christian, and Messiaen himself was a practicing Catholic and a church organist.
Olivier Messiaen's Quartet for the End of Time (1941).

Zen meditation music
Specific works include Tony Scott's Music for Zen Meditation.

See also
 Aesthetics of music
 Avant-garde music
 Introspection

References

Cited sources

Further reading
 

Meditation
Religious music
Concepts in the philosophy of mind